Vayda is a surname. Alternative spellings include Veda, Vada, or Vaeyda.

 Andrew P. Vayda, anthropologist
 Jerry Vayda (born 1934), American basketball player
 Shandor Vayda (born 1991), Ukrainian footballer

See also